Turn It On Again: The Hits is a greatest hits album by British progressive rock/pop-rock band Genesis. The album was originally released as a single album on 25 October 1999 by Virgin Records in the UK and on 26 October 1999 by Atlantic Records in the US.

In 2007, an expanded two-disc edition, subtitled The Tour Edition, was released to promote the Turn It on Again reunion tour. All of the tracks, except for "The Carpet Crawlers 1999,"  were remixed by Nick Davis. Besides the 2-CD version, a 2-CD + DVD version was issued, which included The Video Show DVD.

Album profile 
All tracks feature the long-lasting Banks-Collins-Rutherford lineup of Genesis, with the exception of "I Know What I Like (In Your Wardrobe)" and "The Carpet Crawlers 1999", which feature the Banks-Collins-Gabriel-Hackett-Rutherford lineup, and "Congo", which features the Banks-Rutherford-Wilson lineup.

The Tour Edition was released in the US on 11 September replacing The Platinum Collection.

The seven letters of the Genesis logo on the cover are parts of the different album cover logos over the years. They are as follows:
The "G" from ...And Then There Were Three...
The first "E" from the second "E" on We Can't Dance (the first "E" on that album's cover was reversed)
The "N" from Calling All Stations (with a different colour scheme; this was reverted on the 2007 re-issue)
The second "E" from The Lamb Lies Down on Broadway
The first "S" from Duke
The "I" from Genesis
The second "S" from Invisible Touch
The band's official website has taken to using a similar format for its homepage; when the mouse is moved over each letter, the picture changes.

Track listing

Original album (1999)
All songs by Tony Banks, Phil Collins and Mike Rutherford, except where indicated.

The Tour Edition 2-CD (2007)

The Tour Edition 2-CD + DVD (2007)

CDs same as 2-CD release

Personnel 
Tony Banks – keyboards, synthesizer, piano and 12-string acoustic guitar
Mike Rutherford – bass, electric guitar, 12-string acoustic guitar, electric sitar and backing vocals
Phil Collins – vocals, drums and percussion (except on "Congo" and "The Knife")
Steve Hackett – lead guitar on "I Know What I Like", "The Carpet Crawlers", "Counting out Time", "Happy the Man", "Your Own Special Way", "Afterglow, "Pigeons", "Inside and Out" and "A Trick of the Tail"
Peter Gabriel – vocals and flute on "I Know What I Like", "The Carpet Crawlers", "Counting out Time", "Happy the Man" and "The Knife"
Anthony Phillips – lead guitar on "The Knife"
John Mayhew - drums on "The Knife"
Ray Wilson – vocals on "Congo"

Additional personnel

Nir Zidkyahu – drums on "Congo"
Phenix Horns – horns on "No Reply At All"

Charts

Weekly charts

Year-end charts

Certifications

References

1999 greatest hits albums
Albums produced by Nick Davis (record producer)
Albums produced by Hugh Padgham
Albums produced by Trevor Horn
Albums produced by David Hentschel
Genesis (band) compilation albums
Virgin Records compilation albums
Atlantic Records compilation albums